Hopewell is a surname and occasional given name. Notable people with the name include:

 Charles Hopewell (1861–1931), mayor of Ottawa
 Chris Hopewell (fl. 2003–2020), English music video director
 Jacob Hopewell (1831–1875), American inventor and eccentric
 John Hopewell (1920–2015), British urologist
 Menra Hopewell (1821–1881), American physician and author
 Pollard Hopewell (between 1786 and 1789–1813), US Navy midshipman with two navy ships named after him
 Raymont Hopewell (born 1971), American serial killer
 William Hopewell (1867–1928), English footballer
 Hopewell Chin'ono, Zimbabwean journalist and filmmaker

See also
 Hopewell (disambiguation)